The 1940 Eastern Washington Savages football team represented  Eastern Washington College of Education—now known as Eastern Washington University—as a member of the Washington Intercollegiate Conference (WINCO) during the 1940 college football season. Led by 11th-year head coach Red Reese, Eastern Washington compiled an overall record of 6–2 with a mark of 3–1 in conference play, placing second in the WINCO. The Savages played their home games at Woodward Field in Cheney, Washington.

Schedule

References

Eastern Washington
Eastern Washington Eagles football seasons
Eastern Washington Savages football